The Phlorescent Leech and Eddie is the first album from Flo & Eddie, released in 1972. It was made available on CD for the first time in 2008.

Track listing 
All tracks written by Mark Volman and Howard Kaylan except where noted.

Side one
"Flo & Eddie Theme"
"Thoughts Have Turned" 
"It Never Happened" (Volman)
"Burn the House" (Volman)
"Lady Blue" (Kaylan)
"Strange Girl" (Kaylan)
"Who But I"

Side two
"I Been Born Again" 
"Goodbye Surprise" (Gary Bonner, Alan Gordon)
"Nikki Hoi" (Volman,  Kaylan, Jeff Simmons)
"Really Love" (Volman)
"Feel Older Now" (Kaylan)
"There You Sit Lonely"

Personnel 
 Howard Kaylan - vocals; guitar on "Lady Blue"
 Mark Volman - vocals, guitar
 Gary Rowles - lead guitar
 Don Preston - keyboards
 Jim Pons – bass, mandolin 
 Aynsley Dunbar - drums
Lynn Blessing - vibraphone
 Barry Keene - narrator on "Nikki Hoi"
Moe Lakai & The Island Singers - backing vocals on "Nikki Hoi"
Claude Williams - trumpet on "I Been Born Again"
Technical
 Produced by Mark Volman and Howard Kaylan
 Engineered by Barry Keene
Larry Heller - executive producer
 Recorded at Ike Turner's Bolic Sound in Inglewood, California
Gary Burden - art direction
Henry Diltz - photography

References 

1972 debut albums
Flo & Eddie albums
Reprise Records albums
Albums recorded at Bolic Sound